Mohammad Rezaei (born 1958 in Tehran) is a retired Iranian lightweight freestyle wrestler. He won bronze medal at the 1978 World Championships and silver medal at world junior championships in 1977.

References

External links
 UWW Database

1958 births
Living people
World Wrestling Championships medalists
Iranian male sport wrestlers
People from Tehran
20th-century Iranian people
21st-century Iranian people